The Michigan–Latvia National Guard Partnership is one of 25 European partnerships that make up the U.S. European Command State Partnership Program and one of 88 worldwide partnerships that make-up the National Guard State Partnership Program. A partnership was established in 1993 and serves as a model SPP program for other nations. The current focus is HNS/ Reception, Staging, Orientation, and Integration (RSOI), Chemical-Biological-Radiological-Nuclear-Environmental (CBRNE) / Disaster Response, Joint Tactical Air Control (JTAC), Air Force & base development, and Contingency Operation Support.

History

 EU and NATO accession in 2004
 The Economic crisis continues to affect Latvia. Their economy is the worst among the three Baltic States and one of the worst in all of Europe, but recovery is taking place.
 Major concerns are collective security, defense budget and regional defense.
 Latvia has close governmental ties with the Scandinavian and Nordic countries.
 Latvia / MI deployed 3 Operational Mentoring and Liaison Teams (OMLT's) in 2008, 2009, and 2010.
 MI ANG trained first-ever NATO JTAC 's for OMLT's
 OCT 2010 – Latvia hosted SABRE STRIKE, the largest ever joint US/NATO exercise in the Baltic's, including  1,400 soldiers from Latvia, Lithuania, Estonia, Poland and the U.S. (USAREUR, USEUCOM, CONUS)

Partnership focus

Military to Military:
Continue development of JTAC program for NATO partners
Assist in development of Lielvarde Air Base (under construction) through MI ANG SPP exchanges
Continue to participate in NATO exercises, expeditionary operations and ISAF.
Land Forces, at the direction of MG Raimonds Graube (CHOD) begins development of a "5-year plan" with the by-product of projecting future resource requirements
Continue capacity building and development through utilization of SPP exchanges, Mobile Training Teams (MTT's) and major exercise participation
Continue to develop partners Cyber Defense capability through TCT's and Joint Baltic Workshops.

References

External links
The EUCOM State Partnership page for Maryland-Estonia
The Michigan NG State Partnership Program webpage
Department of Defense News on the Michigan-Latvia Partnership
EUCOM SPP
National Guard Bureau SPP
National Guard Bureau SPP News Archives

Latvia–United States military relations
Military alliances involving the United States
National Guard (United States)